Pavel Pavlovich Syutkin (born June 19, 1922) is a former Soviet military leader, artilleryman, and retired colonel. He received the Hero of the Russian Federation award on March 7, 2008.

As of 2020, he is the last veteran of the Great Patriotic War who was awarded the title of Hero during their lifetime.

Biography

Early life 
Syutkin was born on June 19, 2022, in the village of Zapolena, in the Slobodskoy Uyezd of Vyatka Governorate. He spent his childhood in the village of Bobino, Slobodskoy District, Kirov Oblast, and was brought up by a single mother along with another sibling. He began his studies at a rurual school. In 1932, his family moved to Tyumen, where he received further education.

From 1939 to 1941, Syutkin worked as a sailor of the Oryol raid tug of the Tyumen river port and the Ob-Yenisei river expedition. From 1941 to 1942, he worked at the Tyumen plant No. 762 "Mechanic" (now known as the Tyumen Machine Tool Plant).

Great Patriotic War 
In September 1942, Syutkin volunteered to join the Red Army, and was first sent to Bryansk. He fought in the 1539th heavy self-propelled artillery regiment as the commander of a SU-152 assault gun, and later moved to command the battery of self-propelled guns of the 373rd Guards heavy self-propelled artillery Idritsky Twice Red Banner Order of Kutuzov Regiment of the 3rd Belorussian Front.

Syutkin was awarded for the exemplary performance and courage during Soviet offensives that ended with the recapture of Daugavpils and Rēzekne. He received awards twice more later, once during the breakthrough of the German defenses in East Prussia, and another time in capturing the fortress of Pillau.

During the span of the East Prussian offensive, Syutkin's battery destroyed 9 tanks, 10 armored personnel carriers, 12 artillery pieces, 8 six-barreled mortars, 10 bunkers, and around 500 Nazi soldiers in total.

He was twice (1945 and 1946) nominated for the title of Hero of the Soviet Union, but the award was never given due to an error in the documents.

After the war 
After the war ended, Syutkin continued his service in the army. In 1951, he graduated from the Military Logistics Academy, after which he served in various positions. His last position in the military was the deputy division commander for rear. After retiring, he moved to and lived in Estonia. In 1992, he sold his apartment in Estonia, moved to the Russian Federation and invested in shared construction. He was deceived, left homeless and lived in a gatehouse for three years while relying on begging for a living. In 1995, at the invitation of relatives, he moved to the city of Sochi, where for the next 14 years he lived on the balcony of a rented apartment.

Syutkin repeatedly asked the government to confer him the Gold Star Medal for his contribution in the war. In this effort he wrote to the Ministry of Defense, the Main Directorate of Personnel, the army's Central Archive, and other authorities, but received no answer. Later, a group of veterans of the Great Patriotic War sent a letter directly to the President of Russia with a request to personally look into this situation.

By the decree of the President of Russia on March 7, 2008, retired colonel Pavel Pavlovich Syutkin was awarded the title of Hero of the Russian Federation for his contribution 6 decades ago. On April 29 of the same year, on the eve of the celebration of the 63rd anniversary of the Great Victory, Russian President Vladimir Putin presented Syutkin with the Gold Star Medal at the Kremlin.

Syutkin lives in the city of Sochi, Krasnodar Krai. In 2009, he received a new apartment from the state.

References 

1922 births
People from Slobodskoy Uyezd
Soviet colonels
Heroes of the Russian Federation
Recipients of the Order of Honour (Russia)
Recipients of the Order of the Red Banner
Recipients of the Order of Alexander Nevsky
Recipients of the Order of the Red Star
Recipients of the Medal of Zhukov
Living people